Michel DeGuise (born November 6, 1951) is a Canadian former professional ice hockey player who played in the World Hockey Association (WHA). DeGuise played two WHA seasons with the Quebec Nordiques. He was drafted in the second round of the 1971 NHL Amateur Draft by the Montreal Canadiens.

Awards
1969–70 Jacques Plante Memorial Trophy
1970–71 QMJHL First All-Star Team
1972–73 Harry "Hap" Holmes Memorial Award

References

External links

1951 births
Living people
Canadian ice hockey goaltenders
French Quebecers
Ice hockey people from Quebec
Maine Nordiques players
Montreal Canadiens draft picks
Nova Scotia Voyageurs players
Sportspeople from Sorel-Tracy
Quebec Nordiques (WHA) players
Saginaw Gears players
Sorel Éperviers players